Screwball Scramble is a toy made by Tomy that involves guiding a 14-millimeter-diameter chrome steel ball bearing around an obstacle course. A player guides the ball by using various buttons, dials and levers that affect parts of the course. If a mistake is made a player must start again. The aim of the game is to complete the course as fast as possible. It takes no batteries and is recommended for children five and above. The toy was popular during the 1980s, and is still available today.

The toy was originally known as "Run Yourself Ragged", then later "Snafu: The Maze Game That Runs You Ragged", "Crazy Maze", "Tricky Golf", and other names. The device was cloned in the Soviet Union as "Кто быстрее" (Kto bystree - "Who is faster"). A second course, entitled “Screwball Scramble Level 2” and that can be connected to the first one, has also been produced since the early 2020s.

Parts of the course
 The first part of the course is the tilting walkway; by pressing a button the player must tilt the parts of the walkway in order to rock the ball across and place it on the platform at the end.
 By turning a dial the player must pick the ball up from the platform using the magnetic crane and deposit it on the parallel bars.
 The parallel bars are two metal rods on which the ball sits, by moving these rods apart with a lever the ball can be made to roll along the rods. If the rods are opened too far, however, the ball will fall through. If successful, the ball will roll off the end of the rods and onto the unstable table.
 The unstable table is a flat table with a border around it and various pegs in the middle; the player must tilt this table with a lever in order to get the ball onto a ramp at the end, and avoid falling off at a false opening in the border.
 The ramp leads to the tire obstacle, by hitting a button the player must jump up onto successively higher levels and finally through a hoop.
 After this the ball enters a blind (covered) maze, which the player must use a lever to guide the ball through by tilting. The cover for the maze is removable, which is useful for younger players.
 Once through the maze the ball is placed on a rocket-shaped platform which is moved, using the same dial as the crane, to put the ball into a catapult.
 Hitting the final button activates the catapult and fires the ball towards a bell. Once the bell rings the game is over.
 Also, the player can attempt to complete the course before the 60-second timer runs out.

References

External links
 

Takara Tomy